Marina Vladimirovna Andrievskaya (born 20 November 1974) is a former Soviet badminton player, and later represented Sweden.

She won the silver medal at the 2000 European Badminton Championships.

Andrievskaya played badminton at the 2004 Summer Olympics, losing to Zhang Ning of China in the round of 32.

References

External links
 
 
 
 

1974 births
Living people
Badminton players from Moscow
Swedish female badminton players
Russian female badminton players
Soviet female badminton players
Olympic badminton players of Sweden
Badminton players at the 2004 Summer Olympics